The red-headed titi monkey (Cheracebus regulus) is a species of titi, a type of New World monkey, endemic to Brazil. It was originally described as Callicebus regulus in 1927.

References

red-headed titi
Mammals of Brazil
Endemic fauna of Brazil
red-headed titi
red-headed titi